The 1938 Wake Forest Demon Deacons football team was an American football team that represented Wake Forest University during the 1938 college football season. In its second season under head coach Peahead Walker, the team compiled a 4–5–1 record and finished in ninth place in the Southern Conference.

Wake Forest guard Louis Trunzo was selected by the Associated Press as a first-team player on the 1938 All-Southern Conference football team.

Schedule

References

Wake Forest
Wake Forest Demon Deacons football seasons
Wake Forest Demon Deacons football